Synclitodes is a monotypic moth genus of the family Crambidae described by Eugene G. Munroe in 1974. It contains only one species, Synclitodes decoripennis, described in the same article, which is found in Bolivia and Brazil.

References

Natural History Museum Lepidoptera genus database

Acentropinae
Monotypic moth genera
Moths of South America
Crambidae genera
Taxa named by Eugene G. Munroe